{{Infobox military conflict
|conflict=Siege of Johor
|date=July 1587–August 1587
|place=Johor 
|result=Portuguese victory
|combatant1= Portuguese Empire|
|combatant2= Sultanate of Johor|
|commander1=Dom Paulo de Lima|
|commander2=Ali Jalla Abdul Jalil Shah II of Johor|
|strength1=600 Portuguese soldiers  5 galleons  1 carrack  2 galleys 2 half-galleys  about 25 craft
|strength2=12,000 men<ref>Diogo do Couto: [https://books.google.com/books?id=z_dgAAAAcAAJ&pg=PA471 Da Ásia, Década Nona] 1788 edition, volume II, p.471</ref>
|casualties1=80 dead
|casualties2=4,000 dead from military action + 3,000 dead in the retreat
}}

The siege of Johor of 1587 was a military operation in which Portuguese forces successfully sieged, sacked, and razed Johor (Jor'', in Portuguese), capital of its eponymous Sultanate. The city would later be rebuilt in a different location.

Because of a dearth of personnel then available in Malacca, in 1586 naval forces of Johore had begun diverting shipping to the Strait of Singapore. Malacca itself was threatened by a large Johor fleet, but it was driven back by the presence of heavily armed Portuguese galleons in its harbour. For these reasons, the captain of Malacca João da Silva requested from the Viceroy in Goa, Dom Duarte de Meneses, urgent reinforcements to deal with the threat. These numbered 500 men and 3 galleons, under the command of Dom Paulo de Lima.

The forces of Johor were incapable of preventing the heavy Portuguese infantry from landing and storming the city after a naval bombardment, and its Sultan was forced to retreat into the jungle in a rout. The Portuguese captured ample spoils, which included over 1,000 cannon, the great majority of them of small caliber, 1,500 firearms, and burned upwards of 2,000 craft of many sizes. Following the attack, Dom Pedro de Lima (brother of Dom Paulo de Lima) also sacked Bintan, then a vassal of Johor.

See also
Portuguese Malacca
Battle of Ugentana
Battle of Ugentana (1536)
Siege of Malacca (1568)

References 

Johor
Johor (1587)
Johor
History of Johor
1587 in the Portuguese Empire